Ditmar may refer to:

People with the surname
 Art Ditmar (1929–2021), American Major League Baseball pitcher
 Karl von Ditmar (1822–1892), Baltic German geologist and explorer
 Nikolay Fyodorovitch von Ditmar (1865–1919), Russian politician and businessman

People with the given name
 Ditmar Jakobs (born 1953), German soccer player
 Ditmar Staffelt, member of the 16th German Bundestag

See also
 Dietmar, a given name
 Ditmar Award, for Australian science fiction
 Ditmars (disambiguation)
 Dittmar, a surname
Surnames from given names